The First Presbyterian Church is a historic church building at 212 College Avenue in Clarksville, Arkansas.  It is a two-story steel-framed structure, finished in brick.  It is rectangular, with a central sanctuary flanked on the sides by office and meeting spaces.  At the center of its roof is a dome, which is obscured by gabled parapets on the street-facing facades.  The church was designed by Rogers based architect A.O. Clarke, and was completed in 1922 for a congregation founded in 1840.  It is the finest example of Classical Revival architecture in Johnson County.

The building was listed on the National Register of Historic Places in 1991.

See also
National Register of Historic Places listings in Johnson County, Arkansas

References

Churches on the National Register of Historic Places in Arkansas
Neoclassical architecture in Arkansas
Churches completed in 1922
Churches in Johnson County, Arkansas
Presbyterian churches in Arkansas
National Register of Historic Places in Johnson County, Arkansas
Neoclassical church buildings in the United States